The 67th Hong Kong–Macau Interport is an association football match held in Macau on 11 June 2011. Macau captured the champion by winning 1-0.

Squads

Hong Kong
Hong Kong was represented by its under-21 national team.
 Manager: Brian Leung Hung Tak, Wong Wai Shun
 Deputy Manager: Philip Lee Fai Lap
 Head coach: Szeto Man Chun
 Assistant coaches: Poon Man Tik, Yeung Ching Kwong, Chan Chi Hong
 Goalkeeper coach: Fan Chun Yip

Macau
 Manager: Daniel Delgado de Sousa
 Head coach:  Leung Sui Wing
 Coaches: Ku Chan Kuong, Iong Cho Ieng, Chu Hon Ming
 Physio: Lao Chi Leong
 Admin: Leong Ian Teng

Results

References

Hong Kong–Macau Interport
Macau
Hong